San Carlos is a settlement in northwestern East Falkland, lying south of Port San Carlos on San Carlos Water. It is sometimes nicknamed "JB" after a former owner, Jack Bonner.
The settlement consists of a number of properties including a dwelling with a small cafe which also provides craft facilities. As noted in the history section, there is a small museum that pays homage to the Falklands Conflict as well as local nature and culture.

History
The settlement is named after the ship San Carlos, which visited in May 1768. San Carlos grew in the early twentieth century around a factory which froze sheep carcasses.

In 1982 San Carlos was the main British Army bridgehead during the Falklands War, when it was codenamed "Blue Beach".

A museum and the Blue Beach Military Cemetery at San Carlos commemorate that period.

References

See also
 San Carlos River (Falkland Islands)

Populated places on East Falkland